Lewis Ford Hager (October 11, 1877 – February 9, 1932) was an American politician from New York.

Life 
Hager was born on October 11, 1877 in Victory, New York. His father, W. A. Hager, was a prominent member of the Democratic Party in the county.

In 1916, Hager was elected to the New York State Assembly as a Republican, representing Cayuga County. He served in the Assembly in 1917, 1918, 1919, 1920, 1921, and 1922. He then worked as a committee clerk for the Assembly. At the time of his death, he was index clerk of the Assembly.

Hager's wife was Jennie. Their children were Mrs. Evan Pietroff and E. Harris. He was a member of the Freemasons.

Hager died in his Albany apartment of a heart attack on February 9, 1932. He was buried in Victory Union Cemetery.

References

External links 

 The Political Graveyard

1877 births
1932 deaths
People from Cayuga County, New York
20th-century American politicians
Republican Party members of the New York State Assembly
American Freemasons
Burials in New York (state)